The Hong Kong Independence Party (HKIP) is a non-profit organisation which advocates Hong Kong independence or the return of Hong Kong's sovereignty to the United Kingdom. It was registered in the United Kingdom as a political party from 27 February 2015 to 11 February 2018, and is based in London. The party's slogan is "Independence for Hong Kong, rejoin the Commonwealth of Nations".

See also 
 Hong Kong National Party

Notes

References 

Hong Kong and the Commonwealth of Nations
Hong Kong independence movement
Political parties established in 2015
2015 establishments in Hong Kong
Pro-independence parties
Secessionist organizations in Asia